Lower Trebullett is a hamlet in the parish of Lezant, Cornwall, England.

References

Hamlets in Cornwall